Demarest is a borough in Bergen County, in the U.S. state of New Jersey. As of the 2020 United States census, the borough's population was 4,981, an increase of 100 (+2.0%) from the 2010 census count of 4,881, which in turn reflected an increase of 36 (+0.7%) from the 4,845 counted in the 2000 census. Located in the northeastern corner of New Jersey and its Gateway Region, Demarest is part of the New York City Metropolitan Area.

Demarest was formed by an act of the New Jersey Legislature on April 8, 1903, from portions of Harrington Township and Palisades Township. The borough was named for the Demarest family and for the Demarest train station, which had in turn been named for Ralph S. Demarest, who was a director of the Northern Railroad of New Jersey that built the station and represented the area in both the New Jersey General Assembly and the New Jersey Senate in the mid-19th century.

Geography
According to the United States Census Bureau, the borough had a total area of 2.08 square miles (5.38 km2), including 2.07 square miles (5.37 km2) of land and 0.01 square miles (0.02 km2) of water (0.34%).

At the heart of Demarest is an area known as the Duck Pond, which is a section of the Tenakill Brook.

The borough borders the Bergen County municipalities of Alpine, Closter, Cresskill, Dumont and Haworth.

Demographics

2010 census

The Census Bureau's 2006–2010 American Community Survey showed that (in 2010 inflation-adjusted dollars) median household income was $147,714 (with a margin of error of +/− $14,743) and the median family income was $150,208 (+/− $9,154). Males had a median income of $101,085 (+/− $10,254) versus $58,295 (+/− $10,277) for females. The per capita income for the borough was $69,460 (+/− $10,589). About 1.4% of families and 1.2% of the population were below the poverty line, including 1.2% of those under age 18 and none of those age 65 or over.

2000 census
As of the 2000 United States census there were 4,845 people, 1,601 households, and 1,386 families residing in the borough. The population density was 2,343.7 people per square mile (903.7/km2). There were 1,634 housing units at an average density of 790.4 per square mile (304.8/km2). The racial makeup of the borough was 77.28% White, 0.50% African American, 0.02% Native American, 20.25% Asian, 0.02% Pacific Islander, 0.47% from other races, and 1.47% from two or more races. Hispanic or Latino of any race were 3.45% of the population.

As of the 2000 Census, 3.72% of Demarest's residents identified themselves as being of Japanese ancestry, which was the second highest of any municipality in New Jersey—behind Fort Lee (6.09%)—for all places with 1,000 or more residents identifying their ancestry. In this same census, 2.3% of Demarest's residents identified themselves as being of Armenian-American ancestry. This was the 19th highest percentage of Armenian American people in any place in the United States with 1,000 or more residents identifying their ancestry.

There were 1,601 households, out of which 45.5% had children under the age of 18 living with them, 76.2% were married couples living together, 8.0% had a female householder with no husband present, and 13.4% were non-families. 11.6% of all households were made up of individuals, and 7.2% had someone living alone who was 65 years of age or older. The average household size was 3.02 and the average family size was 3.27.

In the borough the age distribution of the population shows 28.9% under the age of 18, 4.7% from 18 to 24, 25.1% from 25 to 44, 26.9% from 45 to 64, and 14.4% who were 65 years of age or older. The median age was 41 years. For every 100 females, there were 96.2 males. For every 100 females age 18 and over, there were 90.9 males.

The median income for a household in the borough was $103,286, and the median income for a family was $113,144. Males had a median income of $82,597 versus $43,750 for females. The per capita income for the borough was $51,939. About 0.9% of families and 1.6% of the population were below the poverty line, including 0.7% of those under age 18 and 1.6% of those age 65 or over.

Government

Local government
Demarest is governed under the Borough form of New Jersey municipal government, which is used in 218 municipalities (of the 564) statewide, making it the most common form of government in New Jersey. The governing body is comprised of a Mayor and a Borough Council, with all positions elected at-large on a partisan basis as part of the November general election. A Mayor is elected directly by the voters to a four-year term of office. The Borough Council is comprised of six members elected to serve three-year terms on a staggered basis, with two seats coming up for election each year in a three-year cycle. The Borough form of government used by Demarest is a "weak mayor / strong council" government in which council members act as the legislative body with the mayor presiding at meetings and voting only in the event of a tie. The mayor can veto ordinances subject to an override by a two-thirds majority vote of the council. The mayor makes committee and liaison assignments for council members, and most appointments are made by the mayor with the advice and consent of the council.

, the Mayor of Demarest Borough is Democrat Brian K. Bernstein, whose term of office ends December 31, 2026. Members of the Borough Council are Council President Andrea Slowikowski (R, 2024), Daryl Ury Fox (D, 2024), Mary Lynne Hamilton (D, 2023), David Jiang (D, 2025), Rebecca LaPira (D, 2023) and Daniel Marks (D, 2025).

On the night of the November 2018 general election, Melinda Iannuzzi won the first seat with 1,099 votes and Republican Joseph Gray won the second seat with 1,094 votes with Jim Caroll in fourth place; Later that month, once all ballots were counted and the results were certified, Carroll pulled ahead and won the second council seat up for election.

Joseph N. Connolly was appointed to take office in December 2015, filling the vacant seat expiring in December 2017 left by the resignation of Republican Steve Schleim. In the November 2016 general election, Democrat Rebecca LaPira was elected to serve the one year remaining on the term of office.

Gregg Paster was appointed in October 2013 to fill the vacant seat of Blake Chroman that was due to expire at the end of 2015. Paster served on an interim basis until a special ballot item in November 2014, when voters chose him to serve the balance of Chroman's term of office.

Federal, state and county representation
Demarest is located in the 5th Congressional District and is part of New Jersey's 39th state legislative district.

Politics
As of March 2011, there were a total of 3,117 registered voters in Demarest, of which 984 (31.6% vs. 31.7% countywide) were registered as Democrats, 589 (18.9% vs. 21.1%) were registered as Republicans and 1,542 (49.5% vs. 47.1%) were registered as Unaffiliated. There were 2 voters registered as Libertarians or Greens. Among the borough's 2010 Census population, 63.9% (vs. 57.1% in Bergen County) were registered to vote, including 88.1% of those ages 18 and over (vs. 73.7% countywide).

In the 2016 presidential election, Democrat Hillary Clinton received 1,578 votes (62.4% vs. 54.2% countywide), ahead of Republican Donald Trump with 853 votes (33.7% vs. 41.1% countywide) and other candidates with 68 votes (2.7% vs. 3.0% countywide), among the 2,528 ballots cast by the borough's 3,491 registered voters, for a turnout of 72.4% (vs. 73% in Bergen County). In the 2012 presidential election, Democrat Barack Obama received 1,211 votes (51.0% vs. 54.8% countywide), ahead of Republican Mitt Romney with 1,127 votes (47.5% vs. 43.5%) and other candidates with 17 votes (0.7% vs. 0.9%), among the 2,373 ballots cast by the borough's 3,343 registered voters, for a turnout of 71.0% (vs. 70.4% in Bergen County). In the 2008 presidential election, Democrat Barack Obama received 1,388 votes (54.9% vs. 53.9% countywide), ahead of Republican John McCain with 1,105 votes (43.7% vs. 44.5%) and other candidates with 14 votes (0.6% vs. 0.8%), among the 2,526 ballots cast by the borough's 3,212 registered voters, for a turnout of 78.6% (vs. 76.8% in Bergen County). In the 2004 presidential election, Democrat John Kerry received 1,292 votes (51.4% vs. 51.7% countywide), ahead of Republican George W. Bush with 1,204 votes (47.9% vs. 47.2%) and other candidates with 12 votes (0.5% vs. 0.7%), among the 2,512 ballots cast by the borough's 3,083 registered voters, for a turnout of 81.5% (vs. 76.9% in the whole county).

In the 2013 gubernatorial election, Republican Chris Christie received 62.5% of the vote (883 cast), ahead of Democrat Barbara Buono with 36.4% (515 votes), and other candidates with 1.1% (15 votes), among the 1,452 ballots cast by the borough's 3,167 registered voters (39 ballots were spoiled), for a turnout of 45.8%. In the 2009 gubernatorial election, Democrat Jon Corzine received 823 ballots cast (48.2% vs. 48.0% countywide), ahead of Republican Chris Christie with 787 votes (46.1% vs. 45.8%), Independent Chris Daggett with 78 votes (4.6% vs. 4.7%) and other candidates with 10 votes (0.6% vs. 0.5%), among the 1,708 ballots cast by the borough's 3,164 registered voters, yielding a 54.0% turnout (vs. 50.0% in the county).

Education
The Demarest Public Schools serve students in kindergarten through eighth grade. As of the 2018–19 school year, the district, comprised of three schools, had an enrollment of 695 students and 70.3 classroom teachers (on an FTE basis), for a student–teacher ratio of 9.9:1. Schools in the district (with 2018–19 enrollment data from the National Center for Education Statistics) are 
County Road School with 163 students in pre-kindergarten through first grade, 
Luther Lee Emerson School with 214 students in grades 2–4 and 
Demarest Middle School with 309 students in grades 5 through 8.

Students in ninth through twelfth grades attend Northern Valley Regional High School at Demarest in Demarest, together with students from Closter and Haworth. The high school is part of the Northern Valley Regional High School District, which also serves students from Harrington Park, Northvale, Norwood and Old Tappan at Northern Valley Regional High School at Old Tappan. During the 1994–1996 school years, Northern Valley Regional High School at Demarest was awarded the Blue Ribbon School Award of Excellence by the United States Department of Education. As of the 2018–19 school year, the high school had an enrollment of 1,038 students and 97.4 classroom teachers (on an FTE basis), for a student–teacher ratio of 10.7:1.

Public school students from the borough, and all of Bergen County, are eligible to attend the secondary education programs offered by the Bergen County Technical Schools, which include the Bergen County Academies in Hackensack, and the Bergen Tech campus in Teterboro or Paramus. The district offers programs on a shared-time or full-time basis, with admission based on a selective application process and tuition covered by the student's home school district.

The Academy of the Holy Angels is a private middle school and college preparatory high school serving students in sixth through twelfth grade that operates under the auspices of the Roman Catholic Archdiocese of Newark.

Emergency services

Fire department
Demarest has a volunteer fire department that was established in 1894. Its station is located on Park Street and consists of Engine 461, Rescue 465, Engine 2, and Ladder 1.

Medical services
Demarest has a volunteer ambulance corps. that was first established in 1961 and is located on Wakelee Drive.

Police department 
The Demarest Police Department was established in 1903 with its station on Serpentine Road.

Transportation

Roads and highways

County Route 501 and County Route 505 travels through Demarest. While Demarest is a small community, there are often traffic jams at around 8:00 am and 3:00 pm when all three grammar schools let out for the day. These small traffic jams usually occur at the intersection of County Road and Hardenburgh Avenue, and sometimes require the local police to direct traffic.

Public transportation
Demarest is served by Rockland Coaches routes 14ET and 20/20T, with a stop by the Duck Pond on County Route 501 which provides service to and from the Port Authority Bus Terminal in Midtown Manhattan and the Palisades Center in West Nyack, New York, a common shopping destination for many residents.

Saddle River Tours / Ameribus offers rush hour service on the 20 / 84 route to the George Washington Bridge Bus Station.

Demarest was served by the Demarest Railroad Depot until passenger traffic stopped in 1966. After the borough purchased the site in 1978, the station was restored and has been listed on the National Register of Historic Places since 2004.

Notable people

People who were born in, residents of, or otherwise closely associated with Demarest include:

 John Calabro (1914–1994), artist and sculptor who has created coins, medals, plaques, busts, statutes and heroic-size works of famous events and notable figures from the world of politics, sports and entertainment
 Gerald Cardinale (1934–2021), member of the New Jersey Senate since 1982 who served as Mayor of Demarest from 1975 to 1979
 David Einhorn (born 1968), hedge fund manager, Greenlight Capital
 Halim El-Dabh (1921–2017), Egyptian-born composer who made Demarest his home in 1957 and 1958
 Lawrence Frank (born 1970), former head coach of the Detroit Pistons and the New Jersey Nets
 Augustus A. Hardenbergh (1830–1889), represented New Jersey's 7th congressional district from 1875 to 1879, and again from 1881 to 1883
 Gregory T. Linteris (born 1957), scientist who flew as a payload specialist on two NASA Space Shuttle missions in 1997
 Sparky Lyle (born 1944), MLB pitcher who was a resident during his time with the New York Yankees which was mentioned numerous times in his 1979 book The Bronx Zoo
 Ava Markham (born 1999), tennis player
 Aline Brosh McKenna (born 1967), screenwriter
 Bob Menne (born 1942), PGA Tour and Champions Tour golfer
 Herschel L. Mosier (1900–1979), football and basketball player and coach
 Dennis Shulman (born 1950), rabbi, psychologist and politician
 Richard H. Tedford (1929–2011), paleontologist
 Edmund W. Wakelee (1869–1945), President of the New Jersey Senate and the Public Service Corporation
 Lucius Walker (1930–2010), Baptist minister best known for his opposition to the United States embargo against Cuba
 Barry Weiss (born 1959), music industry executive who has been Chairman and CEO of The Island Def Jam Music Group and Universal Republic Records
 Julia Weldon (born 1983), actress

Sources

 Municipal Incorporations of the State of New Jersey (according to Counties), prepared by the Division of Local Government, Department of the Treasury (New Jersey); December 1, 1958.
 Clayton, W. Woodford; and Nelson, Nelson. History of Bergen and Passaic Counties, New Jersey, with Biographical Sketches of Many of its Pioneers and Prominent Men. Philadelphia: Everts and Peck, 1882.
 Harvey, Cornelius Burnham (ed.), Genealogical History of Hudson and Bergen Counties, New Jersey. New York: New Jersey Genealogical Publishing Co., 1900.
 Van Valen, James M. History of Bergen County, New Jersey. New York: New Jersey Publishing and Engraving Co., 1900.
 Westervelt, Frances A. (Frances Augusta), 1858–1942, History of Bergen County, New Jersey, 1630–1923, Lewis Historical Publishing Company, 1923.

References

External links

 
 Demarest Public Schools
 
 Data for Demarest Public Schools, National Center for Education Statistics
 Northern Valley Regional High School District
 Demarest Public Library

 
1903 establishments in New Jersey
Borough form of New Jersey government
Boroughs in Bergen County, New Jersey
Populated places established in 1903